The Hawaii Collegiate Baseball League is a collegiate summer baseball league featuring the Waikiki Surfers, Oahu Paddlers, Hawai'i Ali'is and Kamuela Paniolos. All games are played at Aloha Stadium at Halawa. The league played its inaugural season in summer of 2005.

In 2006 the Kauai Menehune and the Waimea Waves were added to the league.  

In 2007 games were held at Les Murakami Stadium on the University of Hawaii Manoa campus.

Notable players
Joc Pederson

References

External links
Hawaii Collegiate Baseball League

Summer baseball leagues
College baseball leagues in the United States
Baseball in Hawaii
2005 establishments in Hawaii
Sports leagues established in 2005